Robert Kaufman (March 22, 1931 – November 21, 1991) was an American screenwriter, film producer and television writer known for such films and series as Getting Straight, Love at First Bite, She's Out of Control, Divorce American Style, The Cool Ones, Freebie and the Bean, How to Beat the High Co$t of Living, The Monkees, and The Ugliest Girl in Town.

Biography
Born to a Jewish family on March 22, 1931, Kaufman attended Columbia University for three years before leaving to hitchhike across the US and Europe. He then took a job as a publicist for Mort Sahl in New York City and later as a comedy writer in the late 1950s including as a writer for Dick Shawn. In 1961, he moved to Los Angeles where he focused on television scripts before landing his first film credit in 1965 for Ski Party.

In 1983, it inked a non-exclusive deal at Universal Pictures, whereas Kaufman was allowed to serve as writer-producer for the film studio.

Personal life
Kaufman was raised in Westport, Connecticut, and attended Staples High School. In a December 30, 1970, television appearance on The Dick Cavett Show, Kaufman revealed that when his family moved to the town in 1941 they were the first Jewish family to reside in Westport. He was married three times. He had four children from his first marriage: Melissa, Robin, Richard, and Christopher. His third wife was Robin Krause. He died in 1991; services were held at Hillside Memorial Park.

References

External links

American male screenwriters
American television writers
Jewish American screenwriters
American film producers
1931 births
1991 deaths
American male television writers
20th-century American businesspeople
20th-century American male writers
20th-century American screenwriters
20th-century American Jews